Peter Roach may refer to:

Peter Roach (cricketer) (born 1975), Australian cricketer
Peter Roach (phonetician) (born 1943), British phonologist (Emeritus Professor of Phonetics at Reading University)